46–47 The Shambles is an historic pair of buildings in the English city of York, North Yorkshire. Grade II listed, parts of the structures date to the mid-18th century, with a shopfront added in the late 19th century.

As of 2023, number 47 is occupied by Paul Dawson Ltd, a coin and medal trader.

References 

46
Houses in North Yorkshire
18th-century establishments in England
Grade II listed buildings in York
Grade II listed houses
18th century in York